The 1923 Louisville Cardinals football team was an American football team that represented the University of Louisville as an independent during the 1923 college football season. In their first season under head coach Fred Enke, the Cardinals compiled a 5–3 record.

Schedule

References

Louisville
Louisville Cardinals football seasons
Louisville Cardinals football